The Annapolis Police Department (APD) is a full-service law enforcement agency servicing a population of over 38,000 residents in  of the municipality of Annapolis, Maryland.

Address 
Annapolis Police Department
199 Taylor Avenue
Annapolis, MD 21401
(410) 268-9000

History 
The APD started as "city watchmen" with the granting of the city charter in 1708. At the time, the Anne Arundel County Sheriff's Office held concurrent jurisdiction within Annapolis proper for the first six years, after which the city would elect its own Sheriff (as is the case still today in Baltimore).
The term "police officer" was not used until 1861. Like today, these police officers answered to the mayor of the city. It wasn't until 1867 that the Annapolis Police Department was officially created by an act of legislation by the Maryland General Assembly. Today, 131 sworn officers protect a thriving city of 39,000 permanent residents and over 2 million annual visitors. Officers responded to more than 41,000 calls for service in 2007.

Past Chiefs of Police
1867 - 1869 Thomas Basil
1869 - 1870 Nicholas J. Deal
1871 - 1872 Elijah J. Russell
1873 - 1875 Benjamin F. Cadell
1875 - 1879 Henry Burlinghame
1880 - 1882 James B. Thomas
1883 John E. Brown
1883 - 1886 James T. Small
1887 - 1895 Arthur Martin
1896 - 1901 Howard B. Taylor
1901 - 1902 Travers T. Brown
1903 Howard B. Taylor
1904 - 1907 George Hahn, Jr.
1907 - 1925 Charles H. Oberry
1926 - 1935 Richard B. Holliday
1935 - 1949 William R. Curry, Sr.
1949 - 1961 George W. Rawlings
1961 - 1973 Anthony W. Howes
1973 - 1980 Bernard Kalnoske
1980 Samuel A. Cyrus
1980 - 1990 John C. Schmitt
1990 Cassin B. Gittings
1990 - 1994 Harold M. Robbins, Jr.
1994 - 2008 Joseph S. Johnson
2008 - 2017 Michael Pristoop
2017 - 2019 Scott Baker
2019 - 2019 Paul Herman (Acting)
2019 - Present Edward Jackson

Thumbnails

See also 

 List of law enforcement agencies in Maryland

References

External links
Annapolis Police Department weblink
City of Annapolis official homepage

Annapolis, Maryland
Municipal police departments of Maryland